The Nene Whitewater Centre was the UK's first pumped artificial whitewater course. It is located on the River Nene in Northampton.

The 300m course was designed by slalom designers, Proper Channels Ltd and built in 1999 by Wrekin Construction. Water can be partially diverted around a weir via an automatically controlled sluice gate. Additionally, three individually controlled electric pumps allow the centre to pump water from below the weir into the course. The course can be configured to cater for novices, or intermediates.

See also 
Other UK artificial whitewater centres
 Lee Valley White Water Centre
 Cardington Artificial Slalom Course
 Holme Pierrepont National Watersports Centre
 Teesside White Water Course
 Cardiff International White Water

External links 
 Northampton Active, Nene Whitewater Centre Official Website
 Northampton Canoe Club
 Northampton Rowing Club

References 

Artificial whitewater courses in the United Kingdom
Sports venues in Northampton
River Nene